Wenupteryx is an extinct genus of pterodactyloid pterosaur known from the Late Jurassic (Tithonian stage) Vaca Muerta of Neuquén Province, southern Argentina. It was first named by Laura Codorniú and Zulma Gasparini in 2013 and the type species is Wenupteryx uzi. It is a small-sized pterosaur related to the clade Euctenochasmatia or Archaeopterodactyloidea.

See also 
 Timeline of pterosaur research

References 

Pterodactyloids
Tithonian life
Late Jurassic pterosaurs of South America
Jurassic Argentina
Fossils of Argentina
Neuquén Basin
Fossil taxa described in 2013